The Religious of the Sacred Heart of Mary (known in the United States as the RSHM and in other parts of the world as RSCM) are a global Roman Catholic community of about 900 apostolic religious women. The institute was founded in 1849 in Béziers, France by Father Jean Gailhac and Appollonie Pelissier-Cure. Today the diversity of ministries include educational, pastoral and social services. 

The community is not to be confused with the Religious of the Sacred Heart, another name for the Society of the Sacred Heart, who use the abbreviation RSCJ.

History

The Institute of the Religious of the Sacred Heart of Mary (RSHM) was founded on February 24, 1849 in Béziers, France by Fr. Jean Gailhac and Appollonie Pelissier-Cure, (Mother St. Jean). A group of women gathered together to form a community which took over the direction of a shelter for women and an orphanage. The Institute grew rapidly and by the time the original group made their first profession in May 1851 their number had grown to ten. During her time as superior, a boarding school for girls was begun. In a short time, the sisters expanded their ministry beyond France. 

The rule of life of the Religious of the Sacred Heart of Mary, the RSHM Constitutions, was approved on the diocesan level in 1850, the canonical level in 1880 and revised in 1983.

Government
The major authority of the Religious of the Sacred Heart of Mary is the General Superior, who, with the General Council have residence in Rome, Italy. Smaller units of the institute, known as Provinces, have their own government in relationship to the general government. The general chapter sets goals and establishes priorities for the Institute, and elects the Institute leadership team. The smallest unit of government is the local community, who, with a local coordinator, work in relationship with the provincial.

Provinces
Provincial government is divided into Provinces and Regions. The RSHM provinces are as follows:

 Eastern American Province. Includes Northern and Southern United States, Missouri and international schools in England, France and Italy.
 Western American Province. Includes California and Mexico. 
 Northern European Province. Includes England, Ireland, Wales, Scotland and France
 Brazilian Province. Includes Brazil
 Portuguese Province. Includes Portugal and Mali
 Region of Mozambique. Includes Mozambique
 Zambezi Region. Includes Zambia and Zimbabwe

Apostolate
As of 2023, the community serves in 14 countries. RSHM work in colleges and universities, secondary and elementary schools. RSHM serve in parishes and prisons, in hospitals and nursing homes, in studios and social centers, in retreat houses and retirement homes. Religious of the Sacred Heart of Mary are administrators, teachers, social workers, artists, lawyers, health care personnel, musicians, librarians, spiritual directors, and others.

Schools

Europe
Marymount International School, London, UK
Sacred Heart of Mary Girls' School, London, UK
Seafield Convent Grammar School, Crosby, UK (merged to become Sacred Heart Catholic College)
Marymount International School, Paris, France
Istituto Marymount, Rome, Italy
Marymount International School of Rome, Italy
Colégio do Sagrado Coração de Maria - Fátima, Fátima, Portugal
Colégio do Sagrado Coração de Maria, Lisbon, Portugal
Colégio de Nossa Senhora do Rosário, Porto, Portugal*
Rathmore Grammar School Belfast, Northern Ireland

North America
Colegio Marymount, Cuernavaca, Mexico
Corvallis High School, Studio City, USA (closed)
Marymount High School, Los Angeles, USA
Marymount School of New York, New York City, USA
Sacred Heart of Mary High School, Montebello, USA (merged to become Cantwell-Sacred Heart of Mary High School)
Mother Butler Memorial High School, San Jose, California, USA (closed)

South America
Marymount School Bogotá, Bogotá, Colombia
Marymount School Medellín, Medellín, Colombia
Marymount International School, Barranquilla, Colombia
Colégio Sagrado Coração de Maria, Belo Horizonte, Brasil
Colégio Sagrado Coração de Maria, Rio de Janeiro, Brasil
Colégio Sagrado Coração de Maria, Brasília, Brasil
Colégio Sagrado Coração de Maria, Ubá, Brasil
Colégio Sagrado Coração de Maria, Vitória, Brasil

Colleges and Tertiary Institutions

United States
Loyola Marymount University, Los Angeles, California (co-sponsored with the Society of Jesus)
Marymount California University, Rancho Palos Verdes, California
Marymount Manhattan College, New York City (Decided to become non-sectarian in 1961)
Marymount University, Arlington, Virginia
Marymount College, Tarrytown, New York (absorbed by Fordham, later closed)

RSHM and justice
As a religious institute and a non-governmental organization (NGO), RSHM place its resources at the service of those who are most in need of justice, enabling the powerless, the deprived, the marginalized, the voiceless to work effectively for their own development and liberation.

Notes

Bibliography
 Connell, Kathleen, RSHM. A Journey in Faith and Time: History of the Religious of the Sacred Heart of Mary. Vol. 2: The Growth of the Institute: The Foundations during Mother St. Croix Vidal's Leadership 1869–1878. Religious of the Sacred Heart of Mary, 1995.
 Gailhac, Venerável P. Jean. Cartas, Vol. I and II.
 Gailhac, R. P. The Religious Life. New York, 1934. English translation of R. P. Gailhac, La Vie Religieuse. 2 vols. Lille, 1892.
 Leray, Abbé F. Un Apôtre: Le Père Gailhac (1802–1890), Fondateur des Religieuses du Sacre Coeur de Marie. Paris: Éditions Spes, 1939.
 Maymard, V. Beatification and canonization of the servant of God, John Gailhac, priest and founder of the Institute of the Sacred Heart of Mary: inquiry into the historical value of Father V. Maymard's biography. Sacred Congregation of Rites, Historical Section. Westminster, MD: Christian Classics, 1977.
Milligan, Mary, RSHM. "That They May Have Life": A Study of the Spirit-Charism of Father Jean Gailhac, Founder. Dissertatione Ad Doctoratum, Pontificiae Universitatis Gregorianae, 1975.
 Sampaio, Rosa do Carmo, RSHM. A Journey in Faith and Time: History of the Religious of the Sacred Heart of Mary. Vol. 1: The Birth of the Institute: Its Development during Mother Saint Jean's Lifetime 1802–1869''. Religious of the Sacred Heart of Mary, 1995.

External links
 Brazilian Province
 Portuguese Province
 Northern European Province —  
 RSHM Generalate
 RSHM Network of Schools
 RSHM - School and Colleges

Religious organizations established in 1849
Catholic religious institutes established in the 19th century
1849 establishments in France